Rezé-Pont-Rousseau is a railway station in Rezé, Pays de la Loire, France. The station is located on the Nantes–La Roche-sur-Yon railway. The station is served by the following TER Pays de la Loire services operated by the SNCF:
local services Nantes - Sainte-Pazanne - Pornic
local services Nantes - Sainte-Pazanne - Saint-Gilles-Croix-de-Vie

The station is also served by Nantes Tramway line 2.

References

Transport in Nantes
TER Pays de la Loire
Railway stations in Loire-Atlantique